Joan Lorraine Walley (born 23 January 1949) is a British Labour Party politician, who served as Member of Parliament (MP) for Stoke-on-Trent North from the 1987 general election until 2015.

Early life
She attended Biddulph Grammar School (now known as Woodhouse Middle School) in Biddulph, north Staffordshire. At the University of Hull, she gained a BA in Social Administration. From the University College of Wales, Swansea, she gained a Diploma in Community Work Development. From 1970–73, she worked on an Alcoholics Recovery Project. From 1974–78, she was a Local Government Officer for Swansea City Council. She worked for Wandsworth Council from 1978–79. From 1979–82, she was a Development Officer for NACRO.

Parliamentary career
Following the deselection of her predecessor John Forrester, she stood as the Labour Party candidate for Stoke-on-Trent North (the second female MP for the seat after Harriet Slater) and became the constituency's Member of Parliament (MP) at the 1987 general election. Walley had previously been a Lambeth councillor.

She was elected by the House to be the Chair of the Environmental Audit Committee on 9 June 2010.

In November 2013 she announced her intention to stand down at the next general election in 2015. Walley became a member of the Electoral Commission in 2018.

Personal life
She married Jan Ostrowski in 1981; the couple have two sons; Daniel, born 1981, and Tom, born 1983. Walley is a supporter of Port Vale, the football club in her constituency.

References

External links

1949 births
Living people
20th-century British women politicians
21st-century British women politicians
Alumni of Swansea University
Alumni of the University of Hull
Confederation of Health Service Employees-sponsored MPs
Councillors in the London Borough of Lambeth
Female members of the Parliament of the United Kingdom for English constituencies
Labour Party (UK) MPs for English constituencies
People from Biddulph
Politicians from Staffordshire
UK MPs 1987–1992
UK MPs 1992–1997
UK MPs 1997–2001
UK MPs 2001–2005
UK MPs 2005–2010
UK MPs 2010–2015
20th-century English women
20th-century English people
21st-century English women
21st-century English people
Women councillors in England